Events in the year 1893 in Portugal.

Incumbents
Monarch: Charles I

Events

Arts and entertainment

Sports
F.C. Porto founded
Associação Naval 1º de Maio founded

Births

14 October – José Júlio da Costa, left-wing political activist who assassinated President Sidónio Pais of Portugal in 1918 (died 1946).

Deaths

References

 
1890s in Portugal
Portugal
Years of the 19th century in Portugal
Portugal